G. Nizamudeen alias MGK. Nizamudeen was elected to the Tamil Nadu Legislative Assembly from the Nagapattinam constituency in the 1996 elections. He was a candidate of the Indian National League in alliance with Dravida Munnetra Kazhagam (DMK) party.

He is currently the All India General Secretary of Indian National League.

References 

Year of birth missing
Possibly living people
Tamil Nadu MLAs 1996–2001
Dravida Munnetra Kazhagam politicians